Kumsar (also Romanized as Kūmsār; also known as Gol Sarak-e Bālā Maḩalleh, Kolasarak, Kolsarak, Kulisarak, and Kūmsarak) is a village in Jirdeh Rural District, in the Central District of Shaft County, Gilan Province, Iran. At the 2006 census, its population was 559, in 128 families.

References 

Populated places in Shaft County